Gulf Strike is a 1984 video game published by The Avalon Hill Game Company.

Gameplay
Gulf Strike is a game, based on the Gulf Strike board game, in which Iran and Iraq are about to end a stalemated war and the US and USSR seek to determine which of them will control Iran.

Reception
Mark Bausman reviewed the game for Computer Gaming World, and stated that "GS is a detailed game which can be played by both intermediate and advanced wargamers and provides the players with a wide variety of strategic options. The human-computer interface is nicely done considering the amount of items the program must handle."

Reviews
Computer Gaming World - Jun, 1991

References

External links
Review in Compute!
Review in Antic
Review in Family Computing
Review in GAMES Magazine
Review in Hardcore Computist
Review in Ahoy!
Article in Tilt (French)

1984 video games
Apple II games
Atari 8-bit family games
Avalon Hill video games
Cold War video games
Commodore 64 games
Computer wargames
DOS games
Turn-based strategy video games
Video games based on board games
Video games developed in the United States
Video games set in Iran
Works about the Iran–Iraq War